The 17th Santosham Film Awards is an awards ceremony held at Hyderabad, India on 29 September 2019 recognized the best films and performances from the Tollywood films and music released in 2018, along with special honors for lifetime contributions and a few special awards. The awards are annually presented by Santosham magazine. It was live telecasted on 99TV network and was re-telecasted on Zee Telugu and Zee Cinemalu.

Honorary Awards 

 Santosham Lifetime Achievement Award – Jamuna
Santosham Lifetime Achievement Award (Film Journalism) – Gudipoodi Srihari 
 Santosham Allu Ramalingaiah Smarakam Award – Vennela Kishore
 Santosham Daggubati Ramanaidu Smarakam Award – Dil Raju
Santosham Excellence Awards – Roja Ramani and Prabha

Main Awards

Film

Music

Presenters

Performers 

 Avika Gor
 Sampoornesh Babu
 Deepthi Sunaina
 Nabha Natesh
 Singer Baby
 Natasha Doshi
 Tejaswi Madivada
 Raghuram, Sruthi & Gayathri

Notes

References

External links 

 17th Santosham Film Awards 2019 on ZEE5

2019 Indian film awards
Santosham Film Awards
2019 film awards